MythBusters is a science entertainment TV program created and produced by Australia's Beyond Television Productions for the Discovery Channel.

There is no consistent system for organizing MythBusters episodes into seasons. The show does not follow a typical calendar of on- and off-air periods. The official MythBusters website lists episodes by calendar year. On the other hand, Discovery sells the DVD sets for "seasons", which sometimes follow the calendar year and sometimes do not. In addition, Discovery also sells "collections" which divide up the episodes in a different way: each collection has about 10 or 12 episodes from various seasons. This list follows the calendar year as per the official episode guide.

Including Specials and the revival series, a total of 296 episodes of MythBusters have aired so far.

Series overview

Episode list

Pilot episodes

2003 season

2004 season

2005 season

2006 season

2007 season

2008 season

2009 season

2010 season

2011 season

2012 season

2013 season

2014 season

2015 season

2016 season

2017 season

2018 season

Special episodes

References

General references that apply to most episodes

External links

  at Discovery Channel